Cournot competition is an economic model used to describe an industry structure in which companies compete on the amount of output they will produce, which they decide on independently of each other and at the same time. It is named after Antoine Augustin Cournot (1801–1877) who was inspired by observing competition in a spring water duopoly. It has the following features:
 There is more than one firm and all firms produce a homogeneous product, i.e., there is no product differentiation;
 Firms do not cooperate, i.e., there is no collusion;
 Firms have market power, i.e., each firm's output decision affects the good's price;
 The number of firms is fixed;
 Firms compete in quantities rather than prices; and
 The firms are economically rational and act strategically, usually seeking to maximize profit given their competitors' decisions.

An essential assumption of this model is the "not conjecture" that each firm aims to maximize profits, based on the expectation that its own output decision will not have an effect on the decisions of its rivals.
Price is a commonly known decreasing function of total output. All firms know , the total number of firms in the market, and take the output of the others as given. The market price is set at a level such that demand equals the total quantity produced by all firms.
Each firm takes the quantity set by its competitors as a given, evaluates its residual demand, and then behaves as a monopoly.

History

Antoine Augustin Cournot (1801–1877) first outlined his theory of competition in his 1838 volume Recherches sur les Principes Mathématiques de la Théorie des Richesses as a way of describing the competition with a market for spring water dominated by two suppliers (a duopoly). The model was one of a number that Cournot set out "explicitly and with mathematical precision" in the volume. Specifically, Cournot constructed profit functions for each firm, and then used partial differentiation to construct a function representing a firm's best response for given (exogenous) output levels of the other firm(s) in the market. He then showed that a stable equilibrium occurs where these functions intersect (i.e., the simultaneous solution of the best response functions of each firm).

The consequence of this is that in equilibrium, each firm's expectations of how other firms will act are shown to be correct; when all is revealed, no firm wants to change its output decision. This idea of stability was later taken up and built upon as a description of Nash equilibria, of which Cournot equilibria are a subset.

The legacy of the Recherches
Cournot's economic theory was little noticed until Léon Walras credited him as a forerunner. This led to an unsympathetic review of Cournot's book by Joseph Bertrand which in turn received heavy criticism. Irving Fisher found Cournot's treatment of oligopoly "brilliant and suggestive, but not free from serious objections". He arranged for a translation to be made by Nathaniel Bacon in 1897.

Reactions to this aspect of Cournot's theory have ranged from searing condemnation to half-hearted endorsement. It has received sympathy in recent years as a contribution to game theory rather than economics. James W. Friedman explains:
In current language and interpretation, Cournot postulated a particular game to represent an oligopolistic market...

The maths in Cournot's book is elementary and the presentation not difficult to follow. The account below follows Cournot's words and diagrams closely. The diagrams were presumably included as an oversized plate in the original edition, and are missing from some modern reprints.

Cournot's conceptual framework
Cournot's discussion of oligopoly draws on two theoretical advances made in earlier pages of his book. Both have passed (with some adjustment) into microeconomic theory, particularly within subfield of Industrial Organization where Cournot's assumptions can be relaxed to study various Market Structures and Industries, for example, the Stackelberg Competition model. Cournot's discussion of monopoly influenced later writers such as Edward Chamberlin and Joan Robinson during the 1930s revival of interest in imperfect competition.

The 'Law of Demand' or 'of Sales'

Cournot was wary of psychological notions of demand, defining it simply as the amount sold of a particular good (helped along by the fact that the French word débit, meaning 'sales quantity', has the same initial letter as demande, meaning 'demand' ). He formalised it mathematically as follows:
We will regard the sales quantity or annual demand , for any commodity, to be a function  of its price.
It follows that his demand curves do some of the work of modern supply curves, since producers who are able to limit the amount sold have an influence on Cournot's demand curve.

Cournot's duopoly theory

Monopoly and duopoly
Cournot insists that each duopolist seeks independently to maximize profits, and this restriction is essential, since Cournot tells us that if they came to an understanding between each other so as each to obtain the maximum possible revenue, then completely different results would be obtained, indistinguishable from the consumer's point of view from those entailed by monopoly.

Cournot's price model
Cournot presents a mathematically correct analysis of the equilibrium condition corresponding to a certain logically consistent model of duopolist behaviour. However his model is not stated and is not particularly natural (Shapiro remarked that observed practice constituted a "natural objection to the Cournot quantity model"), and "his words and the mathematics do not quite match".

His model can be grasped more easily if we slightly embellish it. Suppose that there are two owners of mineral water springs, each able to produce unlimited quantities at zero price. Suppose that instead of selling water to the public they offer it to a middle man. Each proprietor notifies the middle man of the quantity he or she intends to produce. The middle man finds the market-clearing price, which is determined by the demand function  and the aggregate supply. He or she sells the water at this price, passing the proceeds back to the proprietors.

Each proprietor is assumed to know the amount being supplied by his or her rival, and to adjust his or her own supply in the light of it to maximize his or her profits. The position of equilibrium is one in which neither proprietor is inclined to adjust the quantity supplied.

It needs mental contortions to imagine the same market behaviour arising without a middle man.

Interpretative difficulties
A feature of Cournot's model is that a single price applies to both proprietors. He justified this assumption by saying that "dès lors le prix est nécessairement le même pour l'un et l'autre propriétaire". de Bornier expands on this by saying that "the obvious conclusion that only a single price can exist at a given moment" follows from "an essential assumption concerning his model, [namely] product homogeneity".

Later on Cournot writes that a proprietor can adjust his supply "en modifiant correctement le prix". Again, this is nonsense: it is impossible for a single price to be simultaneously under the control of two suppliers. If there is a single price, then it must be determined by the market as a consequence of the proprietors' decisions on matters under their individual control.

Cournot's account threw his English translator (Nathaniel Bacon) so completely off-balance that his words were corrected to "properly adjusting his price". Edgeworth regarded equality of price in Cournot as "a particular condition, not... abstractly necessary in cases of imperfect competition". Jean Magnan de Bornier says that in Cournot's theory "each owner will use price as a variable to control quantity" without saying how one price can govern two quantities. A. J. Nichol claimed that Cournot's theory makes no sense unless "prices are directly determined by buyers". Shapiro, perhaps in despair, remarked that "the actual process of price formation in Cournot's theory is somewhat mysterious".

Collusion
Cournot's duopolists are not true profit-maximizers. Either supplier could increase his or her profits by cutting out the middle man and cornering the market by marginally undercutting his or her rival; thus the middle man can be seen as a mechanism for restricting competition.

Finding the Cournot duopoly equilibrium

Example 1 
Cournot's model of competition is typically presented for the case of a duopoly market structure; the following example provides a straightforward analysis of the Cournot model for the case of Duopoly. Therefore, suppose we have a market consisting of only two firms which we will call firm 1 and firm 2. For simplicity, we assume each firm faces the same marginal cost.
This assumption tells us that both firms face the same cost-per-unit produced. Therefore, as each firm's profit is equal to its revenues minus costs, where revenue equals the number of units produced multiplied by the market price, we can denote the profit functions for firm 1 and firm 2 as follows:

For example's sake, let us assume that price (inverse demand function) is linear and of the form .

Now, substituting our equation for price in place of  we can write each firm's profit function as:

As firms are assumed to be profit-maximizers, the first-order conditions (F.O.C.s) for each firm are:

The F.O.C.s state that firm  is producing at the profit-maximizing level of output when the marginal cost is equal to the marginal revenue. Intuitively, this suggests that firms will produce up to the point where it remains profitable to do so, as any further production past this point will mean that , and therefore production beyond this point results in the firm losing money for each additional unit produced. Notice that at the profit-maximizing quantity where , we must have  which is why we set the above equations equal to zero.

Now that we have two equations describing the states at which each firm is producing at the profit-maximizing quantity, we can simply solve this system of equations to obtain each firm's optimal level of output,  for firms 1 and 2 respectively. So, we obtain:

These functions describe each firm's optimal (profit-maximizing) quantity of output given the price firms face in the market, the marginal cost, and output quantity of rival firms. The functions can be thought of as describing a firm's "Best Response" to the other firm's level of output.

We can now find a Cournot-Nash Equilibrium using our "Best Response" functions above for the output quantity of firms 1 and 2. Recall that both firms face the same cost-per-unit and price. Therefore, using this symmetrical relationship between firms we find the equilibrium quantity by fixing . We can be sure this setup gives us the equilibrium levels as neither firm has an incentive to change their level of output as doing so will harm the firm at the benefit of their rival.
.

So, at equilibrium, the total market output  will be .

Example 2 
The first proprietor maximizes profit by optimizing over the parameter under his control, giving the condition that the partial derivative of his profit with respect to  should be 0, and the mirror-image reasoning applies to his or her rival. We thus get the equations:
 and
.
The equlibirum position is found by solving these two equations simultaneously. This is most easily done by adding and subtracting them, turning them into:
 and
, where .

Cournot goes further than this simple solution, investigating the stability of the equilibrium. If the first proprietor was providing quantity , then the second proprietor would adopt quantity  from the red curve to maximize his or her revenue.

Since proprietors move towards the equilibrium position it follows that the equilibrium is stable, but Cournot remarks that if the red and blue curves were interchanged then this would cease to be true. He adds that it is easy to see that the corresponding diagram would be inadmissible since, for instance, it is necessarily the case that . To verify this, notice that when  is 0, the two equations reduce to:
 and
.
Evidently, the sales quantity which maximizes monetary value is reached before the maximum possible sales quantity (which corresponds to a value of 0). So, the root  of the first equation is necessarily greater than the root  of the second equation.

Comparison with monopoly

If we plot another variable  against , then we may draw a curve of the function . Hence, prices are lower under duopoly than under monopoly, and quantities sold are accordingly higher.

Extension to oligopoly
When there are  proprietors, the price equation becomes . Hence, the price diminishes indefinitely as the number of proprietors increases. With an infinite number of proprietors, the price becomes zero; or more generally, if we allow for costs of production, the price becomes the marginal cost.

Bertrand's critique
The French mathematician Joseph Bertrand, when reviewing Walras's Théorie Mathématique de la Richesse Sociale, was drawn to Cournot's book by Walras's high praise of it. Bertrand was critical of Cournot's reasoning and assumptions, Bertrand claimed that "removing the symbols would reduce the book to just a few pages". His summary of Cournot's theory of duopoly has remained influential:
Cournot assumes that one of the proprietors will reduce his price to attract buyers to him, and that the other will in turn reduce his price even more to attract buyers back to him. They will only stop undercutting each other in this way, when either proprietor, even if the other abandoned the struggle, has nothing more to gain from reducing his price. One major objection to this is that there is no solution under this assumption, in that there is no limit to the downward movement... If Cournot's formulation conceals this obvious result, it is because he most inadvertently introduces as D and D' the two proprietors' respective outputs, and by considering them as independent variables, he assumes that should either proprietor change his output then the other proprietor's output could remain constant. It quite obviously could not.
Pareto was unimpressed by Bertrand's critique, concluding from it that Bertrand 'wrote his article without consulting the books he criticised'.

Irving Fisher outlined a model of duopoly similar to the one Bertrand had accused Cournot of analysing incorrectly:
A more natural hypothesis, and one often tacitly adopted, is that each [producer] assumes his rival's price will remain fixed, while his own price is adjusted. Under this hypothesis each would undersell the other as long as any profit remained, so that the final result would be identical with the result of unlimited competition.
Fisher seemed to regard Bertrand as having been the first to present this model, and it has since entered the literature as Bertrand competition.

See also
 Aggregative game
 Bertrand competition
 Bertrand–Edgeworth model
 Conjectural variation
 Game theory
 Hotelling's linear city model
 Nash equilibrium
 Stackelberg competition
 Tacit collusion

Notes

References

Further reading
 Holt, Charles. Games and Strategic Behavior (PDF version), PDF
 Tirole, Jean. The Theory of Industrial Organization, MIT Press, 1988.
 Oligoply Theory made Simple, Chapter 6 of Surfing Economics by Huw Dixon.
 Shumpeter, Joseph, History of Economic Analysis (1954). Discusses Cournot at length.

Economics models
Non-cooperative games
Competition (economics)
Oligopoly